The 2019 Copa Argentina Final was the 109th and final match of the 2018–19 Copa Argentina. It was played on December 13, 2019 at the Estadio Malvinas Argentinas in Mendoza between Central Córdoba (SdE) and River Plate.

River Plate defeated Central Córdoba (SdE) in the final to win their third title. As champions, they qualified for the 2020 Copa Libertadores group stage and the 2019 Supercopa Argentina.

Qualified teams

Road to the final

Match

Details

Statistics

References

2019 in Argentine football
2018-19
2018–19 domestic association football cups
Club Atlético River Plate matches